Aurivela tergolaevigata is a species of teiid lizard endemic to Argentina.

References

tergolaevigata
Reptiles described in 2004
Taxa named by Mario R. Cabrera
Reptiles of Argentina